Králův Dvůr is a town in Beroun District in the Central Bohemian Region of the Czech Republic. It has about 10,000 inhabitants. Králův Dvůr creates a conurbation with Beroun.

Administrative parts

Villages of Karlova Huť, Křižatky, Levín, Počaply, Popovice and Zahořany are administrative parts of Králův Dvůr.

Geography
It lies mostly in the Hořovice Uplands.

The Litavka River flows through the town. Its tributary the Mlýnský Brook supplies a system of ponds south of the town. The Suchomastský Stream flows into the Litavka east of the town. It was originally water reservoir for the local iron processing industry, but today it is used for breeding fish and as a drinking water reserve.

History
The first written mention of Králův Dvůr is from 1394, when King Wenceslaus IV of Bohemia was captured by Bohemian nobility here.

In the middle of the 13th century, King Wenceslaus I probably had a medieval court built here, which in 1585 was rebuilt into a Renaissance castle by the Lobkowicz family, who owned it for a time in the second half of the 16th century.

In 1850, municipalities of Králův Dvůr, Popovice, Karlova Huť a Křížatky were merged and created a single municipality. Králův Dvůr was joined to Beroun in 1980 as a housing and industrial suburb. In 1990, Králův Dvůr became an independent municipality again. In 2004, it became a town.

In 1988, the D5 motorway was built, splitting Králův Dvůr into two halves. Ironworks were decommissioned in the 1990s, significantly improving air pollution.

History of administrative parts

The first written mention of Popovice is from 1266 when it was possessed by the Chotěšov Abbey. An iron smeltery was situated here, as well as iron mills powered by running water, which was fed by a system of ponds. Two ponds have been preserved – Měřák and Popovícký.

Karlova Huť was an iron smeltery established at the latest in the 1350s. In the 16th century, it was owned by the noble family of Karlové of Svárov, after which it got its name. In 1595, the very first blast furnace in Bohemia was built here. The settlement was mostly demolished in 1960 when the smeltery was expanded to iron works and cement plants were established. Although the classic blast furnace production ended here in the 1980s, the company's tradition continues to this day.

Počaply was first mentioned in 1253. The workers' colony for the nearby iron works was erected in 1905. In 1915, a monumental building of the elementary school was built.

Křižatky was first mentioned in 1603. It was a small settlement situated in the hills, where blacksmiths from Karlova Huť lived. One hundred years later it no longer existed, but at the end of the 18th century it was restored again.

The first written mention of Levín is from 1391.

Zahořany was first mentioned in 1525, and in 1980 was joined to Beroun. Between 1990 and 2002, Zahořany was an independent municipality, and on 1 January 2003, Zahořany joined Králův Dvůr.

Demographics
In the 21st century, population numbers are growing. Proximity to the capital city of Prague makes Králův Dvůr a favourite place for people to live.

Transport

The D5 motorway from Prague to Plzeň and the border with Germany passes through the town.

Sights

The main landmark is Králův Dvůr Castle. In 1585, the stone court was rebuilt in the Renaissance style into a closed four-winged castle with an inner courtyard. During the great fire in 1712, the castle lost one wing. The biggest changes awaited the castle in the second half of the 18th century when it was rebuilt in the Baroque style. It received roughly its present appearance, which was most likely created by Kilian Ignaz Dientzenhofer.

In 1860, the castle was sold to Emil Egon Fürstenberg, who had no interest in keeping the property in good shape, and the castle was used as a warehouse. After World War II, the chastle was nationalized, and state enterprises were maintained by using its buildings as a warehouse. The castle's garden was used as a path for the D5 highway. The castle was sold to a private owner in 2000 and its reconstruction is planned.

The Church of the Assumption of the Virgin Mary was built in Počaply in 1730–1733, most likely by K. I. Dientzenhofer.

Notable people
Jan Preisler (1872–1918), painter and art professor

References

External links

Cities and towns in the Czech Republic
Populated places in the Beroun District